Events in the year 2022 in Switzerland.

Incumbents 

 President of the Swiss Confederation: Ignazio Cassis
 President of the National Council: Irène Kälin
 President of the Swiss Council of States: Thomas Hefti

Events 
Ongoing — COVID-19 pandemic in Switzerland

Arts and entertainment
 75th Locarno Film Festival August 3 – 13

Deaths 

 7 January – Laurence Boissier, writer and artist (born 1965).
 20 January - René Robert, photographer (born 1936).
 21 January - Marcel Mauron, footballer (FC La Chaux-de-Fonds, national team) (born 1929).
 24 January - Silvia Gmür, architect (born 1939).
 26 January - Gérald Ducimetière, artist (born 1940).
 2 February - J. Alexander Baumann, politician (born 1942).
 3 February - Georges Athanasiadès, organist and choirmaster (born 1929).
 5 February - Emanuel Hurwitz, psychoanalyst and politician (born 1935).
 6 February - Alice Moretti, politician (born 1921).
 14 February - Francine-Charlotte Gehri, writer (born 1923).
 8 March - Dominique Warluzel, lawyer and playwright (born 1957).
 19 March - Pierre Naftule, writer and theatre director (born 1960).
 10 May - Nessim Gaon, Sudanese born financier (born 1922)
 2 June - Valentin Oehen, politician (born 1931)
 10 July - Hans Frauenfelder, biophysicist (born 1922)
 10 July - Marcel Rémy, mountaineer (born 1923)
 12 July - Ivo Fürer, Roman Catholic prelate (born 1930)
 14 July - Erica Pedretti, artist (born 1930)
 15 July - Alice Pauli, artist (born 1922)
 20 July - Judith Stamm, politician (born 1934)
 22 July - Emilie Benes Brzezinski, sculptor (born 1932)
 24 July - Kurt Pfammatter, ice hockey player (born 1941)
 29 July - Hans Bangerter, football administrator (born 1924)
 5 August - Mariella Mehr, writer (born 1947)
 13 August - Antoine Poncet, sculptor (born 1928)
 21 August - Oliver Frey, visual artist (born 1948)
 22 August - Fredy Studer, drummer (born 1948)
 28 August - Peter Stephan Zurbriggen, Roman Catholic archbishop (born 1943)
 5 September - Mariella Mehr, writer (born 1947)
 5 September - Margrith Bigler-Eggenberger, jurist (born 1933)
 9 September - Pierre Muller, politician (born 1952)
 11 September - Alain Tanner, film director (born 1929)
 13 September - Jean-Luc Godard, film director (Breathless, Bande à part, Pierrot le Fou), screenwriter and critic (born 1930)
 16 September - Heinz Allenspach, Swiss politician, MP (born 1928)
 17 September - Mathias Feldges, politician, member of the Executive Council of Basel-Stadt (born 1937)
 18 September - Nicolas Schindelholz, footballer (born 1988)
 3 October - Simon Hallenbarter, Olympic biathlete (born 1979)

References 

 
2020s in Switzerland
Years of the 21st century in Switzerland
Switzerland
Switzerland